Something Personal is an album by saxophonist Houston Person which was recorded in 2015 and released on the HighNote label.

Reception
In JazzTimes, Owen Cordle wrote: "Something Personal is a typical offering from veteran tenor saxophonist Houston Person: warm ballads, an R&B cooker, a couple of standards with a bossa-nova beat and a couple of soulful swingers. ... All around, this is another good one from the ever-dependable Person".

Track listing 
 "The Second Time Around" (Jimmy Van Heusen, Sammy Cahn) – 7:40
 "Crazy He Calls Me" (Carl Sigman, Bob Russell) – 5:01
 "I'm Afraid the Masquerade Is Over" (Herb Magidson, Allie Wrubel) – 5:11
 "The Way We Were" (Marvin Hamlisch, Alan Bergman, Marilyn Bergman) – 7:45
 "Guilty" (Barry Gibb, Robin Gibb, Maurice Gibb) – 7:03
 "Change Partners" (Irving Berlin) – 6:00
 "Teardrops from My Eyes" (Rudy Toombs) – 5:51
 "Something Personal" (Houston Person) – 4:50
 "On the Sunny Side of the Street" (Jimmy McHugh, Dorothy Fields) – 4:00
 "I Remember Clifford" (Benny Golson) – 9:55

Personnel 
Houston Person – tenor saxophone
John Di Martino – piano 
Steve Nelson – vibraphone
James Chirillo – guitar (tracks 2 & 4-6)
Ray Drummond – bass 
Lewis Nash – drums

References 

Houston Person albums
2015 albums
HighNote Records albums
Albums recorded at Van Gelder Studio